Thomas James Lynch (April 3, 1860 – March 28, 1955) was a Major League Baseball player. He made his debut in the short-lived Union Association with the even shorter-lived Wilmington Quicksteps, where he started 16 games during their 18-game tenure; eight as a catcher and eight as an outfielder. After the Quicksteps folded, Lynch resurfaced later in 1884 with the Philadelphia Quakers, where he also equally split his time between catching and outfield duties. He finished up his career with the Quakers in 1885, playing 13 games in the outfield.

External links
, or Retrosheet

Major League Baseball outfielders
Wilmington Quicksteps players
Philadelphia Quakers players
Reading Actives players
Wilmington Quicksteps (minor league) players
Newark Domestics players
Atlanta Atlantas players
Syracuse Stars (minor league baseball) players
Gallaudet Bison baseball players
Hamilton Hams players
Birmingham Maroons players
Jersey City Jerseys players
Wilmington Blue Hens players
Detroit Wolverines (minor league) players
Baseball players from Vermont
1860 births
1955 deaths
19th-century baseball players
People from Bennington, Vermont